Ajay Mehta is an Indian actor based in North America, known for his deep baritone voice.

Early life and education
Mehta was born in New Delhi, India and he was educated in New Delhi, in Mayo College and St. Stephen's College. According to a 2010 interview, he wanted to be an actor since he was three and a half years old and participated in plays while attending college.

Career
He has appeared in many television shows, including  The Mentalist, Eli Stone, Without a Trace, The Sopranos, Sex and the City, NCIS, Anger Management, The Middle, Rules of Engagement, Nip/Tuck, Numb3rs, CSI: NY, Royal Pains, Modern Family, The Good Place, Rectify and Outsourced. He played a Middle Eastern ambassador on 24. He played Citigroup CEO Vikram Pandit in the television movie Too Big to Fail, which was broadcast in the United States on HBO. He appeared as an auctioneer on 2 Broke Girls in September 2012, and as the prime minister of India in G.I. Joe: Retaliation in 2013. He also appears in the video game Far Cry 4.

In 2007, Ajay was cast as an ad campaign spokesman for Fiber One brand products.

Partial filmography

Lonely in America (1990) - Confectionary shop owner
Shao nu Xiao Yu (1995) - Photo store manager
Mercy (1995) - Taxi Driver
Taxi Bhaiya (1996) - Taxi Bhai
The Last Days of Disco (1998) - Pharmacist
Star of Jaipur (1998) - Captain Kaushik
Tales of The Kama Sutra 2: Monsoon (1999) - Inspector General Ranjeet Singh
Chutney Popcorn (1999) - Dr. Sud
Just One Time (1999) - Husan
Astoria (2000) - Lawyer
The Sopranos (2000) - Sundeep
Serendipity (2001) - Pakistani Cab Driver
Spider-Man (2002) - Cabbie #1
The Guru (2002) - Swami Bu
Penny Ante (2002) - Detective Lawford
People I Know (2002) - Cab Driver
Looking for Comedy in the Muslim World (2005) - Indian Official
Americanizing Shelley (2007) - Jaspal Singh
24 (2007) - Middle Eastern Ambassador
Ocean of Pearls (2008) - Ravinder Singh
Superhero Movie (2008) - Convenience Store Owner
The Ode (2008) - Mr. Surani
Lakeview Terrace (2008) - Doctor
Ashes (2010) - Mr. Patel
Happy Feet Two (2011) - Indian Penguin (voice, uncredited)
Troublemaker (2011) - Dev
The Son of an Afghan Farmer (2012) - Mr. Amir
G.I. Joe: Retaliation (2013) - Indian Prime Minister 
Decoding Annie Parker (2013) - OB / GYN Doctor
Trainwreck (2015) - Dr. Raj
68 Kill (2017) - Sam
Poor Greg Drowning - Doctor

References

External links

American male film actors
Living people
People from New Delhi
Indian emigrants to the United States
American male actors of Indian descent
1938 births